David Rudikovich Davidyan (born 14 December 1997) is a Russian-Armenian footballer who plays for Pyunik, on loan from FC Khimki. He most often plays in the right winger position.

Club career
On 8 August 2021, Russian Premier League club FC Khimki announced the signing of Davidyan. He made his debut in the RPL for Khimki later on the same day in a game against FC Rostov, he substituted Senin Sebai in added time.

On 5 July 2022, Davidyan joined FC Pyunik on loan for the 2022–23 season.

International career
He was born and raised in Russia, but is eligible to represent either Russia or Armenia. He was called up to the Armenia national football team in June 2021 for friendlies, but did not make his debut due to an injury.

Career statistics

Club

References

External links
 
 
 

1997 births
Sportspeople from Nizhny Novgorod
Russian sportspeople of Armenian descent
Living people
Russian footballers
Armenian footballers
Association football midfielders
FC Nosta Novotroitsk players
FC Ararat Moscow players
FC Ararat-Armenia players
FC Ararat Yerevan players
FC Alashkert players
FC Khimki players
FC Pyunik players
Russian Second League players
Armenian Premier League players
Russian Premier League players